The Golden West Invitational (GWI) high school track & field all-star meet brings together top high school athletes from throughout the country and provides them with the very highest levels of competition. The GWI made its debut in 1960 and is held in the Sacramento, CA area in June each year. 

Past participants have represented the United States in every Olympic Games since 1964 and have filled more than 150 positions on the American Olympic Track & Field teams. They have won more than 75 medals, 40 of them gold. An additional nine GWI athletes represented their native countries of France, Ireland, Japan, Trinidad/Tobago, Fiji, Jamaica and Cape Verde Islands.

GWI alums include the following track & field legends: 
Evelyn Ashford
Bob Beamon
Stacy Dragila
Marty Liquori
Steve Prefontaine
Jim Ryun
Tommie Smith
Dwight Stones
James Beckford
Marion Jones

Recent Olympic medalists who participated at the GWI meet include:
Allyson Felix
Kenny Harrison 
Joanna Hayes
Monique Henderson
Meb Keflezighi
Jeremy Wariner 

Future NFL football stars who participated at the GWI meet include:
Terry Bradshaw
Michael Carter
Russ Francis
Bob Hayes
James Lofton
Art Monk
Mel Renfro

External links
Golden West Invitational web site

College track and field competitions in the United States
Annual track and field meetings
Recurring sporting events established in 1960
Sports competitions in Sacramento, California
High school track and field competitions in the United States